Zivlan (also, Zivlən, Ziblan, and Zivlyan) is a village in the Dashkasan Rayon of Azerbaijan.  The village forms part of the municipality of Çanaqçı.

References 

Populated places in Dashkasan District